is a railway station in Asahikawa, Hokkaidō, Japan.

Lines
Hokkaido Railway Company
Hakodate Main Line Station A27

Adjacent stations

Railway stations in Japan opened in 1911
Railway stations in Hokkaido Prefecture
Buildings and structures in Asahikawa